Imre Rapp (15 September 1937 − 3 June 2015) was a Hungarian football goalkeeper, who played for Pécsi Mecsek FC.

He participated in UEFA Euro 1972 for the Hungary national football team.

References

1937 births
2015 deaths
Association football goalkeepers
Hungarian footballers
Hungary international footballers
UEFA Euro 1972 players
Olympic footballers of Hungary
Footballers at the 1972 Summer Olympics
Olympic silver medalists for Hungary
Olympic medalists in football
Medalists at the 1972 Summer Olympics